Pyridinium refers to the cation . It is the conjugate acid of pyridine. Many related cations are known involving substituted pyridines, e.g. picolines, lutidines, collidines. They are prepared by treating pyridine with acids.

As pyridine is often used as an organic base in chemical reactions, pyridinium salts are produced in many acid-base reactions. Its salts are often insoluble in the organic solvent, so precipitation of the pyridinium leaving group complex is an indication of the progress of the reaction.

Pyridinium cations are aromatic, as determined through Hückel's rule. They are isoelectronic with benzene.

N-Alkylpyridinium cations

When the acidic proton is replaced by alkyl, the compounds are called N-alkylpyridinium. A simple representative is N-methylpyridinium. These pyridinium intermediates have been used as electrophiles in synthetic organic chemistry to build dearomatized congeners called dihydropyridines, as demonstrated in one example from Smith in 2021. Earlier, the same research group also delineated the rules surrounding regioselectivities associated with adding nucleophiles to pyridinium electrophiles with varying substituents. From a commercial perspective, an important pyridinium compound is the herbicide paraquat.

See also
 Pyridinium chlorochromate
 Pyridinium chloride

References